Huitema is a Dutch surname. Notable people with the surname include:

Christian Huitema (born 1953), French computer scientist
Durkje Huitema (1918-2010), Dutch speed skater
Jan Huitema (born 1984), Dutch politician
Jordyn Huitema (born 2001), Canadian soccer player

Dutch-language surnames